Rossbeevera eucyanea is a species of the fungal family Boletaceae. This species was described from Japan.

References 

Fungi of China
Boletaceae